Hercules: The Legendary Journeys is an out-of-print collectible card game by Wizards of the Coast based on the Hercules television series. It was first released in July 1998. The original set had 180 cards. Booster packs had 12 cards. It was the third and last game released using the ARC System. The game is a simplified Deckmaster system with four different card types: Resource, Character, Combat, and Action.
The ARC System allowed Hercules: The Legendary Journeys to be played with C-23 and Xena: Warrior Princess.

World champions

References

Card games introduced in 1998
Collectible card games
Wizards of the Coast games